Robert Muter Stewart, J. P., (17 December 1831 – 17 September 1908) was a member of the Queensland Legislative Assembly, and acted as Colonial Secretary in the George Thorn and John Douglas Ministries from June 1876 to March 1877.

Stewart was born in Glasgow, Scotland. Stewart was a member for Brisbane City in the Queensland Parliament from 14 November 1873 to 1 February 1878.
Stewart later resided in London and was a member of the Board of Advice to the Agent-General, and a director on the London Board of the Queensland National Bank.

Stewart died in Hove, England on 17 September 1908.

External links
Photograph of Stewart

References

1831 births
1908 deaths
Members of the Queensland Legislative Assembly
Politicians from Glasgow
Scottish emigrants to Australia
19th-century Australian politicians